Colin Andrew White (born January 30, 1997) is an American professional ice hockey center who is currently playing for the Florida Panthers of the National Hockey League (NHL). He was originally selected by the Ottawa Senators in the first round, 21st overall, in the 2015 NHL Entry Draft.

Early life
White was born on January 30, 1997, in Hanover, Massachusetts to parents Mark and Christine. His father played collegiate football and track and field at Georgia Tech while his mother played tennis at Florida State University. He began ice skating after his sister had her eighth birthday party at an ice rink. Growing up, he rooted for the Pittsburgh Penguins and his favorite player was Mario Lemieux.

Playing career
White played high school hockey at Noble and Greenough School before joining the USA Hockey National Team Development Program (U.S. NTDP). As a member of the  U.S. NTDP, he played the 2013–14  and 2014–15 seasons in the United States Hockey League (USHL). White's play was rewarded when he was invited to skate in the 2014 CCM/USA Hockey All-American Prospects Game. In his final season with the U.S. NTDP, White recorded 17 points in 20 games.

White was selected in the first round, 21st overall, by the Ottawa Senators in the 2015 NHL Entry Draft.

White played college hockey at Boston College from 2015 to 2017. He scored his first collegiate hat-trick on January 8, 2016, against Providence. In 2015–16, White was named to the Hockey East All-Rookie Team.

Following the 2016–17 season, White signed an amateur tryout with the Senators' American Hockey League (AHL) affiliate, the Binghamton Senators on March 26. He recorded three points in three games. On April 2, the Ottawa Senators signed White to a three-year, entry-level contract. He made his NHL debut the following day in a 5–4 loss to the Detroit Red Wings.

White split his first professional season between Ottawa and Binghamton. On February 6, 2018, he recorded his first career NHL goal in a 5–3 win over the New Jersey Devils. He finished his first season in Ottawa with six points in 21 games.

In his first full season with Ottawa, White recorded 14 goals and 41 points in 71 games. On August 21, 2019, the Senators signed White to a six-year, $28.5 million contract extension.

On October 5, 2021, White stained an upper-body injury five minutes into a pre-season game against the Toronto Maple Leafs after a collision with David Kämpf. As such, he was expected to miss four to six months to recover from shoulder surgery. White later returned in the  season to record 3 goals and 10 points through 24 games.

Having been affected through injury and failing to live up to his contract expectations, on July 5, 2022, White was placed on unconditional waivers by the Senators and upon clearing was bought out from the remaining three-years of his contract. On the opening day of free agency, White was signed to a one-year, $1.2 million contract with the Florida Panthers on July 13, 2022.

International play

Colin White competed as a member of Team USA at the 2014 IIHF World U17 Championships, where he set a USA record of 18 points in six games.  He helped lead Team USA to a Gold medal defeating Canada in the championship game.

White competed as a member of Team USA at the 2015 IIHF World U18 Championships, where he scored the overtime game-winning goal to defeat Finland in the gold medal game.

In 2016, White represented Team USA at the IIHF World Junior Championships, where he helped Team USA win a bronze medal in Helsinki, Finland.

In 2017, Colin White competed as a member of Team USA at the 2017 IIHF World Junior Championships, where he scored to tie the game that went to overtime in which USA defeated Canada in the gold medal game.

After the Senators failed to qualify for the 2018 Stanley Cup playoffs, White was named to represent Team USA's 2018 IIHF World Championship roster. He scored 2 goals and 3 points in 10 games to help the United States claim the bronze medal in Denmark.

On April 19, 2019, White was selected to represent Team USA at the 2019 IIHF World Championship, held in Bratislava and Kosice, Slovakia.

Career statistics

Regular season and playoffs

International

Awards and honors

References

External links 
 

1997 births
Living people
American expatriate ice hockey players in Canada
American men's ice hockey centers
Belleville Senators players
Binghamton Senators players
Boston College Eagles men's ice hockey players
Florida Panthers players
Ice hockey players from Massachusetts
National Hockey League first-round draft picks
Ottawa Senators draft picks
Ottawa Senators players
USA Hockey National Team Development Program players